In Greek mythology, Aba was a Thracian naiad nymph from the town of Ergisce in Ciconia. She became the mother by Poseidon, of a son Ergiscus after whom Çatalca (Ergisce), took its name from its founder. Aba is presumed to be a daughter of the river Hebros.

Notes

Reference 
 Suida, Suda Encyclopedia translated by David Whitehead. Online version at the Topos Text Project.

Naiads
Children of Potamoi
Women of Poseidon